An Thới is a township in Phu Quoc, Vietnam. It is an archipelago located in the Gulf of Thailand, with coordinates of about 9° 50′ north latitude and 104° 05′ east longitude. The archipelago is under the management of Hon Thom commune, Phu Quoc district, Kien Giang province, Vietnam. The waters are clear; and in some places the sea is nearly 30 m deep.

References

Populated places in Kiên Giang province
Townships in Vietnam